Paciphacops is a genus of trilobites from the order Phacopida, suborder Phacopina. This genus is easily mistaken for the more common and popular genus Phacops and Kainops. It takes a careful eye to spot the difference. One major difference between Paciphacops and Phacops is that the central raised area (or glabella) of the headshield (or cephalon) extends beyond its anterior margin. The difference between Paciphacops and Kainops is that Kainops has more eye facets than Paciphacops. The skin (or sclera) is thickened and bulges compared to the edge of each lens. This genus can be found primarily in the United States and Australia.

Species 
Paciphacops birdsongensis, Tennessee.
Paciphacops campbelli, Oklahoma.
Paciphacops claviger, Nevada.
Paciphacops logani, Oklahoma.
Paciphacops crosslei, Australia.
Paciphacops latigenalis, Australia.

References 

Phacopidae
Devonian trilobites of North America
Trilobites of Australia